The 1941 Philippine presidential and vice presidential elections were held on November 11, 1941, a month before the Attack on Pearl Harbor; and subsequently, the Japanese invasion of the Philippines, which brought the Philippines and the United States to the Second World War. Incumbent President Manuel Luis Quezon won an unprecedented second partial term as President of the Philippines in a landslide. His running mate, Vice President Sergio Osmeña, also won via landslide. The elected officials however, did not serve their terms from 1942 to 1945 due to World War II. In 1943, a Japanese-sponsored Republic was established and appointed Jose P. Laurel as president. From 1943 to 1945, the Philippines had two presidents. Quezon died in 1944 of tuberculosis and was replaced by Sergio Osmeña.

Results
Quezon and Osmeña performed better than their 1935 poll performance, winning all the provinces. Their feat as a tandem is unmatched to date.

President

Vice-President

See also
 Commission on Elections
 Politics of the Philippines
 Philippine elections

References

External links
 TERRITORIES: Bedroom Campaign, Time Magazine, November 24, 1941,
 Manuel L. Quezon on the Presidential Museum and Library

1941
1941 elections in the Philippines